June N. Honaman (May 24, 1920 – December 3, 1994) is a former Republican member of the Pennsylvania House of Representatives.

References

Republican Party members of the Pennsylvania House of Representatives
Women state legislators in Pennsylvania
1920 births
1994 deaths
20th-century American politicians
20th-century American women politicians